Cicindela interrupta is a beetle of the family Carabidae.

Description
Head, pronotum and elytra are dark brown, with yellow marking on elytra. It has giant prominent compound eyes and large jaws.

Distribution
This species occurs in Angola, Benin, Cameroon, Central African Republic, Republic of the Congo, Equatorial Guinea, Gabon, Guinea, Guinea Bissau, Ivory Coast, Liberia, Mali, Nigeria and Sierra Leone.

References
 Universal Biological Indexer
 Carabidae.pro

External links
 Hunterian Museum

interrupta
Beetles described in 1775
Taxa named by Johan Christian Fabricius